Jinbei is a Chinese automobile marque owned by Renault Brilliance Jinbei Automotive Co., Ltd., a joint venture between Brilliance Auto (51%) and Renault (49%) established in December 2017 and based in Shenyang, Liaoning, China. Until 2017, the marque was owned by Shenyang Brilliance Jinbei Automotive, a Brilliance subsidiary also based in Shenyang.

There are other sister companies which also used or are related to the Jinbei marque: Brilliance Shineray and listed company Shenyang Jinbei Automotive.

History
The Jinbei marque was launched into the market in 1991, selling products with Toyota's technology.

The Jinbei marque was used and produced by listed company Shenyang Jinbei Automotive, which formed a joint venture with General Motors (GM), as well as Shenyang Jinbei Coach Manufacturing with Brilliance Auto, which later known as Shenyang Brilliance Jinbei. Shenyang Jinbei Automotive was acquired by FAW Group in 1995, but sold back to the local government of Shenyang in 2000. The joint venture, with GM, is no longer in operation.

The listed company was acquired by Brilliance Auto Group, the parent company of the listed company Brilliance Auto, in 2018.

Despite retaining the name "Jinbei", Shenyang Jinbei Automotive no longer produces automobile but automobile parts only. The Jinbei marque is mainly produced by Shenyang Brilliance Jinbei Automotive instead.

In December 2017, Brilliance Auto and Renault announced the latter would be acquiring a 49% of the marque's owner company Shenyang Brilliance Jinbei Automotive, which was later reincorporated as Renault Brilliance Jinbei. The transaction was completed in January 2018.

Jinbei's upmarket sister marque Huasong was launched in 2014.

Products
Brilliance (through its subsidiary Shenyang Automotive) has manufactured and sold all of its minibuses under the Jinbei and Huasong marques in a variety of models based on the structure of the Toyota HiAce vans in China. The Group's principal minibus products are the deluxe minibus and the mid-priced minibus, targeting different market segments in the Chinese commercial and passenger car segments. The deluxe models and mid-priced models include the Granse, the Aurora and the Shuttler etc.

Shenyang Jinbei has produced the Jinbei Haise, also known as the "Haishi", the Jinbei's version of the Toyota HiAce, and also produced the Granvia, locally called the "Geruisi" (Jinbei Granse).

Chinese-built models are exported to numerous countries. One of their export markets is Chile, which started to receive them in 2008.

In 2018, Renault Brilliance Jinbei announced plans to launch up to seven light commercial vehicles and SUVs with Renault technology, under the Jinbei and Renault marques.

Production outside China
Units for the African market are manufactured by the Bavarian Auto Manufacturing Company, an Egyptian subsidiary of BMW, in the 6th of October City South west Cairo-Egypt. Available model is the Jinbei Cargo Van (de) which is available as an ambulance or police car also. It is assembled in the 1999 and 2003 generation versions.

Another manufacturer of Jinbei vehicles is IKK Ichigan, Inc. in Manila, Philippines which offers the assembled models Jinbei 2 Ton, Jinbei 3 Ton and Jinbei 3 Ton. The Haise and Granse models are imported by the company and are not listed in its official product lineup.

Models

Current 
 Jinbei Konect (Guanjing)
 Jinbei Granse
 Jinbei Granse Classic
 Jinbei Haise MK5
 Jinbei Haise MK6
 Jinbei New Haise
 Jinbei Grand Haise
 Jinbei F50
 Jinbei S70 (Jinbei Tjatse S70)
 Jinbei Haishiwang

Discontinued
 Jinbei Blazer (in co-operation with GM)
 Jinbei S30 - a subcompact crossover
 Jinbei S50 - a compact crossover
 Jinbei 750 - a compact MPV
 Jinbei Haixing X30 - (Jinbei X30) - a micro passenger van.
 Jinbei Haixing A7 (A9) - a micro passenger van.
 Jinbei Haise X30L
 Jinbei Haise S

Gallery

References

External links
 

Vehicle manufacturing companies established in 1991
Chinese companies established in 1991
Brilliance Auto
Renault
Cars of China
Chinese brands
Companies based in Shenyang